The Catholic Church in Croatia is part of the worldwide Catholic Church that is under the spiritual leadership of the Pope, Roman Curia and the Croatian Bishops' Conference. Its administration is centered in Zagreb, and it comprises five archdioceses, 13 dioceses and one military ordinariate. Cardinal Josip Bozanić is the Roman Catholic Archbishop of Zagreb.

There are an estimated 3.7 million baptized Latin Catholics and about 20,000 baptized Greek Catholics in Croatia, comprising 86.3% of the population, according to the 2011 census. Weekly Church attendance is relatively high compared to other Catholic nations in Europe, being around 27%. The national sanctuary of Croatia is in Marija Bistrica, while the country's patron is Saint Joseph since the Croatian Parliament declared him to be in 1687.

History

Roman Illyrians and early Christianity
The western part of the Balkan Peninsula was conquered by the Roman Empire by 168 BC after a long drawn out process known as the Illyrian Wars.

Following their conquests, the Romans organised the area into the province of Illyricum, which was eventually split up into Dalmatia and Pannonia. Through being part of the Roman Empire, various religious cults were brought into the region. This included the Levantine-originated religion of Christianity.

Indeed, Salona, a Greek-founded city close to modern Split, was one of the earliest places in the region connected with Christianity. It was able to gain influence first among some of the Dalmatian Jews living in the city. St. Titus, a disciple of St. Paul the Apostle and the subject of the Epistle to Titus in the New Testament, was active in Dalmatia. Indeed, in the Epistle to the Romans, Paul himself speaks of visiting "Illyricum", but he may have meant Illyria Graeca.

Conversion of the Croats

The Croats arrived in the area of present-day Croatia during the early part of the 7th century AD. They came in touch with the Christian natives and started to slowly accept Christianity. Byzantine and Frankish missionaries and Benedictines who were bringing Western cultural influences had a significant role in the christening of Croats.

Croats had their first contact with the Holy See in year 641 when the papal envoy Abbot Martin came to them in order to redeem Christian captives and the bones of the martyrs that Croats were keeping. There is little information about the "Baptism of the Croats", but it is known that it was peacefully and freely accepted, and that it took place between the 7th and the 9th century.

Byzantine emperor Constantine Porphyrogenitus wrote in his book De Administrando Imperio that the Byzantine Emperor Heraclius, during whose reign Croats came to the land between Drava river and the Adriatic Sea (present-day Croatia), "brought priests from Rome who he made into archbishop, bishop, priests and deacons, which then baptized Croats."

Historical sources mention the christening of Croatian rulers Porga, Vojnomir, Višeslava, Borna, Ljudevit Posavski and others.

By the 9th century, Croats have already been fully included in a large European Christian community. Croatian rulers Mislav (around 839), Trpimir I (852) and many others were building churches and monasteries. In 879, Croatian duke Branimir wrote a letter to Pope John VIII in which he promised him loyalty and obedience. Pope John VIII replied with a letter on 7 June 879, in which he wrote that he celebrated a Mass at the tomb of St Peter on which he invoked God's blessing on Branimir and his people.

In 925, Croatian King Tomislav was corresponding with Pope John X  on the occasion of the first Church Council of Split. The pope's letter to the King Tomislav is the first international document in which a Croatian ruler was called rex (King); that is why Tomislav is considered to be the first Croatian king.

King Demetrius Zvonimir was crowned on 8 October 1076 at Solin in the Basilica of Saint Peter and Moses (known today as the Hollow Church) by Gebizon, a representative of Pope Gregory VII.

Zvonimir took an oath of allegiance to Pope, by which he promised his support in the implementations of the Church reforms in Croatia. After the Papal legate crowned him, Zvonimir in 1076 gave the Benedictine monastery of Saint Gregory in Vrana to the Pope as a sign of loyalty and as an accommodation for papal legates coming to Croatia.

Middle Ages

When Croatia lost its own dynasty and entered into a personal union with Hungary in 1102, the Benedictines were slowly dying out, while the mendicant orders, especially Franciscans and  Dominicans were becoming more important. Religious and cultural formation of Croats was also strongly influenced by Jesuits. Church writers from northern Croatia and Dubrovnik, which was a free center of the Croatian culture, have done a lot for standardization and expansion of the Croatian literary language.

Since the 9th century there is in Croatia a unique phenomenon in the entire world of Catholicism, liturgy that was held in Church Slavonic language with special Glagolitic script (Pope was allowing serving liturgy only in Latin). Despite the various disputes, Pope Innocent IV approved use of Church Slavonic language and the Glagolitic script to Filip, bishop of Senj, thus making Croats the only Latin Catholics in the world allowed to use a language other than Latin in their liturgy prior to the Second Vatican Council in 1962.

During the Croatian–Ottoman Wars that lasted from 15th to 19th century Croats strongly fought against the Turks which resulted in the fact that the westernmost border of the Ottoman Empire and Europe became entrenched on the soil of the Croatian Kingdom. In 1519, Croatia was called the Antemurale Christianitatis by Pope Leo X.

Austrian Empire/Austria-Hungary

The Austrian Empire signed a concordat with the Holy See in 1855 which regulated the Catholic Church within the empire.

Kingdom of Yugoslavia

In Yugoslavia, the Croatian bishops were part of the Bishops' Conference of Yugoslavia.

The situation of the Catholic Church in the new kingdom was affected by the pro-Orthodox policy of the Yugoslav government and the strong influence of the Serbian Orthodox Church in the country's politics. After the coup of 1929, several Catholic organizations and institutes were closed or dissolved, specially in Croatia, as the Club of Seniorates, the Eagle Movement (Orlovstvo) and the Catholic Action. Some members of Eastern Catholic churches, such as Croatian Greek Catholics, were persecuted and forced to convert to Orthodox Christianity. In general, Catholicism identified with Croatian groups, while little or nothing did so with Slovenians or Vojvodians.

The Church in the Independent State of Croatia

In 1941, a Nazi puppet state, the Independent State of Croatia (NDH), was established by the fascist dictator Ante Pavelić and his Ustaše movement. The Ustaše regime pursued a genocidal policy against the Serbs (who were Eastern Orthodox Christians), Jews and Romani.

Historian Michael Phayer wrote that the creation of the NDH was initially welcomed by the hierarchy of the Catholic Church and by many Catholic priests. Ante Pavelić was anti-Serb and pro-Catholic, viewing Catholicism as an integral part of Croat culture. A large number of Catholic priests and intellectuals assumed important roles within the Ustaše.

British writer Peter Hebblethwaite wrote that Pavelić was anxious to get diplomatic relations and a Vatican blessing for the new 'Catholic state' but that "neither was forthcoming". The Archbishop of Zagreb, Aloysius Stepinac, wanted Croatia's independence from the Serb dominated Yugoslav state which he considered to be "the jail of the Croatian nation", so he arranged the audience with Pius XII for Pavelić.

Vatican under Secretary of State Giovanni Montini (later Pope Paul VI)'s minutes before the meeting noted that no recognition of the new state could come before a peace treaty and that "The Holy See must be impartial; it must think of all; there are Catholics on all sides to whom the [Holy See] must be respectful." The Vatican refused formal recognition of NDH but Pius XII sent a Benedictine abbot Giuseppe Ramiro Marcone as his apostolic visitor. Pius was criticized for his reception of Pavelić but he still hoped that Pavelić would defeat communist Partisans and reconvert many of the 200,000 who had left the Catholic Church for the Serbian Orthodox Church since World War I.

Many Croatian nationalist clergy supported the Pavelić's regime push to drive out Serbs, Gypsies and Jews, or force their conversion to Catholicism. Phayer wrote that it is well known that many Catholic clerics participated directly or indirectly in Ustaše campaigns of violence. Despite that, Pavelić told Nazi Foreign Minister von Ribbentrop that while the lower clergy supported the Ustaše, the bishops, and particularly Archbishop Stepinac, were opposed to the movement because of "Vatican international policy".

Phayer wrote that Stepinac came to be known as "judenfreundlich" ("Jew friendly") to the Nazi-linked Ustaše regime, and suspended a number of priest collaborators in his diocese.

Archbishop Stepinac made many public statements criticizing developments in the NDH. On Sunday, 24 May 1942, to the irritation of Ustaša officials, he used the pulpit and a diocesan letter to condemn genocide in specific terms, although not mentioning Serbs:

He also wrote a letter directly to Pavelić on 24 February 1943, stating: "The very Jasenovac camp is a stain on the honor of the NDH. Poglavnik! To those who look at me as a priest and a bishop I say as Christ did on the cross: Father forgive them for they know not what they do."

Thirty-one priests were arrested following Stepinac's July and October 1943 explicit condemnations of race murders being read from pulpits across Croatia. Martin Gilbert wrote that Stepinac, "who in 1941 had welcomed Croat independence, subsequently condemned Croat atrocities against both Serbs and Jews, and himself saved a group of Jews".

According to historian Jozo Tomasevich however, neither Stepinac nor the Croatian Catholic hierarchy or the Vatican ever made a public protest regarding the persecution of Serbs and the Serbian Orthodox Church by the Ustaše and added that "it seems the Catholic Church fully supported the Ustasha regime and its policies". The Catholic Press also praised Pavelić and the Ustaše.

The Yugoslav Partisans executed two priests, Petar Perica and Marijan Blažić, as collaborationists on the island of Daksa on 25 October 1944. The Partisans killed Fra Maksimilijan Jurčić near Vrgorac in late January 1945.

The Church in communist Yugoslavia
The National Anti-Fascist Council of the People's Liberation of Croatia (ZAVNOH) originally foresaw a greater degree of religious freedom in the country. In 1944 ZAVNOH still left open the possibility of religious education in schools.

This idea was scuttled after Yugoslav leader Josip Broz removed secretary of the Central Committee of the Communist Party of Croatia Andrija Hebrang and replaced him with hardliner Vladimir Bakarić.

In 1945, the retired bishop of Dubrovnik, Josip Marija Carević, was murdered by Yugoslav authorities. Bishop Josip Srebrnić was sent to jail for two months. After the war, the number of Catholic publications in Yugoslavia decreased from one hundred to only three.

In 1946, the Communist regime introduced the Law on State Registry Books which allowed the confiscation of church registries and other documents. On 31 January 1952, the communist regime officially banned all religious education in public schools.

That year the regime also expelled the Catholic Faculty of Theology from the University of Zagreb, to which it was not restored until democratic changes in 1991.

In 1984, the Catholic Church held a National Eucharistic Congress in Marija Bistrica.

The central mass held on September 9 was attended by 400,000 people, including 1100 priests, 35 bishops and archbishops, as well as five cardinals. The mass was led by cardinal Franz König, a friend of Aloysius Stepinac from their early studies. In 1987 the Bishops' Conference of Yugoslavia issued a statement calling on the government to respect the right of parents to obtain a religious education for their children.

The Church in the Republic of Croatia

After Croatia declared its independence from Yugoslavia, the Catholic Church regained its full freedom and influence.

During the Croatian War of Independence Catholicism and Orthodoxy were often cited as a basic division between Croats and Serbs, which led to a massive destruction of churches (some 1,426 were destroyed or damaged).

In the Republic of Croatia, the Catholic Church has defined its legal position as autonomous in some areas, thus making it able to: provide religious education in state primary and secondary schools to those students who choose it, establish Catholic schools and conduct pastoral care among the Catholics in the armed forces and police.

Through the ratification of treaties between the Holy See and Croatia on 9 April 1997, treaties that regulate legal issues, cooperation in education and culture, conducting pastoral care among the Catholics in the armed forces and police and financing Church from the state budget came into force. As regards to financing, the Church has received the following amounts of money over the last decade: 2001; 461.3 bln kunas, 2004–2007; 532 bln kunas, 2008–2011;475.5 bln kunas, 2012–2013; 523.5 bln kunas, plus around 200 million kunas per each year for teachers of religious studies in schools, around 60 million kunas for maintenance churches which are considered to be a cultural heritage etc.

Catholic Church in Croatia is very active in social and political life. The church has implemented a number of actions in conservative spirit in order to promote its values such as: non-working Sunday, punishment of the crimes of the communist era, introducing religious education in schools, protection of marriage as the union of a man and a woman (2013 referendum), opposition to abortion (campaign: "Protecting human life from conception to natural death"), opposition to euthanasia, opposition to natural methods of family planning and the treatment of infertility, and opposition to artificial birth control methods.

With Croatian independence, the Croatian Bishops' Conference was formed. The Croatian Bishops' Conference established Croatian Catholic Radio in 1997.

Demographics

The published data from the 2011 Croatian census included a crosstab of ethnicity and religion which showed that a total of 3,697,143 Catholic believers (86.28% of the total population) was divided between the following ethnic groups:
 3,599,038 Catholic Croats
 22,331 Catholic believers of regional affiliation
 15,083 Catholic Italians
 9,396 Catholic Hungarians
 8,521 Catholic Czechs
 8,299 Catholic Roma
 8,081 Catholic Slovenes
 7,109 Catholic Albanians
 3,159 Catholic Slovaks
 2,776 Catholic believers of undeclared nationality
 2,391 Catholic Serbs
 1,913 Catholic believers of other nationalities
 1,847 Catholic Germans
 1,692 Catholic Ruthenians
 1,384 Catholic believers of unknown nationality
 1,339 Catholic Ukrainians
 other individual ethnicities (under 1,000 people each)

Organisation

Hierarchy

Within Croatia the hierarchy consists of:

The bishops are organized into the Croatian Conference of Bishops, which is presided by the Archbishop of Zadar Mons. Želimir Puljić.

There are also historical bishoprics, including:
 Diocese of Senj-Modruš

As of 2009, there were 1570 Catholic parishes in Croatia.

Franciscans
There are three Franciscan provinces in the country:
 the Franciscan Province of Saints Cyril and Methodius based in Zagreb,
 the Franciscan Province of Saint Jerome based in Zadar and
 the Franciscan Province of the Most Holy Redeemer based in Split.

Other orders
Croatian Dominican Province
Croatian Province of the Society of Jesus
Croatian Salesian Province of Saint Don Bosco
Croatian Carmelite Province of Saint Joseph the Father

Attitudes
Although the vast majority of Croatians declare themselves as Catholics, many of them do not follow the Church's teaching on moral and social issues. According to a Pew Research poll from 2017, only 27% of respondents attend mass regularly, 25% support the Church's stance on contraception, 43% support the Church's stance on ordination of women and 38% think abortion should be illegal in most cases. On the other hand, 66% support the Church's stance on same-sex marriage.

Controversies 
The Catholic Church in Croatia is criticised by some for promoting and tolerating neo-fascism among its ranks:

Each year in December, the Catholic church in Croatia holds the annual memorial mass dedicated to Ustasha fascist dictator Ante Pavelić in Zagreb and Split. These masses are known to attract groups of Pavelić's supporters dressed in clothes with Ustasha insignia.

During the funeral of convicted ustasha WWII concentration camp commander Dinko Šakić, priest Vjekoslav Lasić said that "every honest Croat should be proud of Šakić's name" and that "court which convicted Šakić, also convicted Croatia and its people". These statements were strongly condemned by Simon Wiesenthal Center and Croatian Helsinki Committee.

Croatian president Kolinda Grabar-Kitarović was criticised on live TV by Croatian friar Luka Prcela for saying that the Independent State of Croatia was a criminal state and wasn't independent. Prcela said that the Independent State of Croatia "never killed anyone outside its own borders" and that former two left-wing presidents of Croatia were "anti-Croatian".

Bishop of Sisak Vlado Košić was one of the signatories of a petition for the introduction of the fascist Ustasha movement salute Za dom spremni to the official use in the Croatian Armed Forces.

On 1 July 2017, Don Anđelko Kaćunko held a memorial mass for Ustasha Black Legion commander Jure Francetić on which he described Francetić as "a patriot who was willing to give his life for the homeland".

On 2 July 2017, media published a picture of a Croatian Catholic priest posing for a picture with a group of young boys on a children's football tournament in Široki Brijeg, Bosnia and Herzegovina. Their team was named "The Black Legion" and boys were all wearing black T-shirts, thus alluding to notorious ustasha militia of the same name.

On 2 September 2017, while holding a mass near the town of Sinj, friar Božo Norac Kljajo equalized Za dom spremni and Praised be Jesus by saying that these are "both good intentioned, human and ancient Christian salutes which don't hold a single drop of hate or vengeance."

Upon the death of Slavko Goldstein, a prominent Croatian writer and publisher of Jewish origin, Mili Plenković, pastor of Hvar, published a Facebook post in which he expressed that he was "happy upon hearing the news that Goldstein died" because according to him: "yet another hater of Croatia vanished from this world".

Places of Pilgrimage of the Croats
Aljmaš
Ludbreg
Our Lady of Marija Bistrica
Our Lady of Sinj
Our Lady of Trsat

Notable people
 Josip Bozanić
 Juraj Dobrila, 19th-century bishop from Istria
 Ivan Grubišić, priest from Dalmatia, Member of Parliament 2011–2015
 Marija Krucifiksa Kozulić, established the only indigenous community of nuns founded in the Archdiocese of Rijeka
 Franjo Kuharić
 Antun Mahnić, initiator of the Croatian Catholic Movement
 Ivan Merz, blessed layman and Catholic activist
 Alojzije Stepinac, archbishop of Zagreb during World War II
 Josip Juraj Strossmayer
 Franjo Šeper
 Mihalj Šilobod Bolšić (1724–1787), a Roman Catholic priest, mathematician, writer, and musical theorist primarily known for writing the first Croatian arithmetic textbook Arithmatika Horvatzka (published in Zagreb, 1758)

See also

 Croatia–Holy See relations

References

Sources

External links

 Croatian Conference of Bishops

 
Croatia
Croatian culture